
Year 223 (CCXXIII) was a common year starting on Wednesday (link will display the full calendar) of the Julian calendar. At the time, it was known as the Year of the Consulship of Maximus and Aelianus (or, less frequently, year 976 Ab urbe condita). The denomination 223 for this year has been used since the early medieval period, when the Anno Domini calendar era became the prevalent method in Europe for naming years.

Events 
 By place 

 Asia 
 Battle of Dongkou: The Chinese state of Cao Wei is defeated by Eastern Wu.

Births 
 Ji Kang, Chinese poet and philosopher (d. 262)
 Wang Hun, Chinese general and politician (d. 297)

Deaths 
 May 6 – Cao Ren (or Zixiao), Chinese general (b. 168)
 June 10 – Liu Bei, Chinese warlord and emperor (b. 161)
 August 1 – Cao Zhang, Chinese prince and warlord
 August 11 – Jia Xu, Chinese official and politician (b. 147)
 Xing Yong (or Zi'ang), Chinese official and politician
 Zhang Ji (or Derong), Chinese official and politician